Rowan Mary Hillson  (born 1951) is a British endocrinologist who established a pioneering diabetes service at Hillingdon Hospital, and was National Clinical Director for Diabetes at the Department of Health. She is the author of several books on diabetes and endocrinology.

Biography 
Hillson studied medicine at the University of Birmingham, graduating with an MB ChB in 1974. She practiced at Birmingham, Liverpool and Oxford before joining Hillingdon Hospital in 1989, where she worked until 2012. During her time as Consultant Physician, Diabetes and Endocrinology at the hospital she developed the Diabetes and Endocrine Unit. As a result of the work of the Unit she and her team won the Hospital Doctor of the Year Diabetes Award in 1997. She was honorary Consultant Physician at the hospital from 2012 to 2013.

Hillson was the National Clinical Director for Diabetes ('the Diabetes Tsar') at the Department of Health from 2008 to 2013. While in this role she established the National Diabetes Information Service.

Hillson was appointed a Member of the Order of the British Empire (MBE) in 2006 for contributions to medicine and healthcare. She was awarded the honorary degree of Doctor of Science (DSc) from Brunel University in 2011 in recognition of her services to medicine and healthcare.

The Joint British Diabetes Societies for Inpatient Care established the Rowan Hillson Insulin Safety Award to promote excellent practice in insulin safety. In 2006 Hilson was elected to the national committee of the Association of British Clinical Diabetologists.

Selected publications 

 Diabetes care : a practical manual, Oxford University Press. (2015) 
 Five years on : delivering the Diabetes National Service Framework. COI for the Department of Health (2008).
 The complete guide : the essential introduction to managing diabetes. Vermillion. (2001). 
 Late onset diabetes : a practical guide to managing diabetes over 40. Vermillion. (1996). 
 Diabetes : a beyond basics guide, Optima. (1992).

References

1951 births
Alumni of the University of Birmingham
Living people
Fellows of the Royal College of Physicians
Members of the Order of the British Empire
English women medical doctors
20th-century English medical doctors
21st-century English medical doctors
20th-century women physicians
21st-century women physicians
British endocrinologists
20th-century English women
20th-century English people
21st-century English women